Michael Ker (born 21 July 1957) is a Canadian former swimmer. He competed in the men's 1500 metre freestyle at the 1976 Summer Olympics.

References

External links
 

1957 births
Living people
Canadian male freestyle swimmers
Olympic swimmers of Canada
Swimmers at the 1976 Summer Olympics
Swimmers from Vancouver
20th-century Canadian people
21st-century Canadian people